Cohaesibacter gelatinilyticus is a gram-negative bacteria from the genus of Cohaesibacter which was isolated from surface of coastal seawater from the east coast of Korea.

References

External links
Type strain of Cohaesibacter gelatinilyticus at BacDive -  the Bacterial Diversity Metadatabase

Hyphomicrobiales
Bacteria described in 2008